Rutkowice may refer to the following places:
Rutkowice, Kuyavian-Pomeranian Voivodeship (central Poland)
Rutkowice, Warmian-Masurian Voivodeship (north-central Poland)